Enteromius brichardi is a species of cyprinid fish native to the Republic of the Congo and Gabon.  This species can reach a length of  TL.

Etymology
The fish is named in honor of African aquarium-fish exporter Pierre Brichard (1921-1990), who collected the type specimen.

References

External links 
 Photograph

Enteromius
Fish described in 1959
Taxa named by Max Poll
Taxa named by Jacques G. Lambert